Pathi Bhakthi is a 1936 Indian Tamil-language drama film directed by P. Y. Altekar. It is based on the Madurai Original Boy's Company (MOBC) theatre troupe's play of the same name. The film stars K. P. Kesavan, Radha Bai and Kali N. Rathnam.

Cast 
 K. P. Kesavan
 M. M. Radha Bai
 Kali N. Rathnam

Production 
Pathi Bhakthi was a Tamil play written by Te. Po. Krishnaswamy Pavalar in the 1930s. It dealt with the evils of drinking and the impact drinking had on family life. The play was staged all over the Madras Presidency with great success. Pavalar's original play was re-written for the Madurai Original Boy's Company (MOBC) theatre troupe by another playwright, Madras Kandaswamy Mudaliar, and was staged more than 150 times. A. N. Marudachalam Chettiar of Manorama Films wanted to produce Pathi Bhakthi as a film, but to his dismay, another film version was already being made without him. P. Y. Alterkar was named director. Mudaliar wanted to launch his son M. K. Radha, a theatre actor, in film with Pathi Bhakthi, but could not because another theatre actor, K. P. Kesavan, had been finalised for the lead role. Kali N. Ratnam made his feature film debut with this film. Radha Bai played the female lead, Jithan Banerjee handled the cinematography, and T. S. Mani was art director.

Reception 
The Indian Express praised the film for the cast performances and less number of songs, but criticised its length. On 14 August 1936, a review from the Malaya Tribune applauded the film, particularly the performances of Kesavan, Ratnam and Radha Bai.

Notes

References

Bibliography 
 
 

Films about alcoholism
Indian drama films
Indian films based on plays
1930s Tamil-language films